Bryan Station was an early fortified settlement at present-day Lexington, Kentucky.

Bryan Station may also refer to:

Bryan station (Ohio), an Amtrak train station in Bryan, Ohio
Bryan Station, Lexington, Kentucky, a neighborhood in Lexington named for the historical settlement